The Fayetteville Cutoff was a railroad line in North Carolina and South Carolina built by predecessors of the Atlantic Coast Line Railroad connecting  Wilson, North Carolina with Pee Dee, South Carolina (just east of Florence).  Its main purpose was to shorten the Atlantic Coast Line's main line.

History
By 1885, the Wilmington and Weldon Railroad and the Wilmington and Manchester Railroad together formed a continuous route from Weldon southeast to Wilmington, which then turned back east to Florence, South Carolina.  Both of these railroads were controlled by William T. Walters and were operated independently but were advertised together as the Atlantic Coast Line.  Despite the importance of the port city of Wilmington, this route gave the Atlantic Coast Line a disadvantage over its competitors who operated more direct north–south routes in North Carolina.  To combat this disadvantage, the management of the railroads planned the Fayetteville Cutoff, which would run from Contentnea (just south of Wilson, North Carolina) through Fayetteville to the Pee Dee River in South Carolina just east of Florence.  The route was largely built in three segments.

The northern segment of the line, which was chartered as the Wilson & Fayetteville Railroad, was built from 1885 to 1886.  It branched off the Wilmington and Weldon Railroad at Contentnea (just south of Wilson) and ran to Fayetteville.

The southern segment of the line, which was chartered as the Florence Railroad by the South Carolina General Assembly in 1882 opened in 1888.  It ran from the Wilmington and Manchester Railroad from Pee Dee (east of Florence) north to the North Carolina/South Carolina border near Rowland, North Carolina.  Some of the right of way near the north end of this segment was provided by J.W. Dillon in exchange for the railroad building a depot in Dillon, his namesake town.

The final segment to be built was the middle section from Rowland to Fayetteville which opened in 1892.  The line was successful and would shorten the distance of the Atlantic Coast Line route by 61 miles.

By 1899, the line, along with the Wilmington and Weldon Railroad and the Wilmington and Manchester Railroad were formally merged into the Atlantic Coast Line Railroad.  The Fayetteville Cutoff would remain part of the Atlantic Coast Line's main line.  Through various mergers, the Atlantic Coast Line Railroad became part of CSX Transportation by 1986.  The line is still operating today and is part of CSX's A Line (South End Subdivision).

Station Listing

References

Railroad cutoffs
CSX Transportation lines
Predecessors of the Atlantic Coast Line Railroad